JaQuan Bailey (born May 28, 1997) is an American football defensive end who is currently a free agent. He was signed as an undrafted free agent in May 2021. He went to college at Iowa State.

Early life and education
Bailey was born on May 28, 1997 in Jacksonville, Florida. He went to William M. Raines High School before attending Iowa State University. He was a 3-star recruit and choose Iowa State over offers from Tennessee, Florida, Louisville, and Virginia Tech. In his first season he played in 12 games, starting 7, and was named Freshmen All-America. The next season he was an Honorable Mention All Big-12, with 7 sacks. He played in 13 games for the second straight year in 2018. He had 46 tackles to lead all Iowa State defensive linemen. He was named Second-team All Big-12 and on the Ted Hendricks award watchlist. In 2019, he played in 4 games before being a medical redshirt. In 2020, he started all 12 games, and was named First-team All-American by two selectors. He was also named First-team All-Big-12.

Professional career

Philadelphia Eagles
Bailey signed as an undrafted free agent with the Philadelphia Eagles after going undrafted in the 2021 NFL Draft. He was waived on August 29, 2021.

Michigan Panthers
Bailey was selected in the 25th round of the 2022 USFL Draft by the Michigan Panthers.

Personal life
His twin brother Joshua also played with Iowa State.

References

1997 births
Living people
Iowa State Cyclones football players
Philadelphia Eagles players
Players of American football from Florida
American football defensive ends
Michigan Panthers (2022) players